The Chief of Staff of the Italian Navy is the commander of the Italian Navy

List of chiefs of staff

Kingdom of Italy

Italian Republic

References

Italian Navy
Italy